Bütow is a municipality  in the Mecklenburgische Seenplatte district, in Mecklenburg-Vorpommern, Germany.

Geography 
Bütow is located in the Mecklenburg Lake Plateau, to the east of the source of the Elde river.

Transportation 
Bütow is located about two kilometers away from the federal highway B 198. The Autobahn 19 Berlin - Rostock is about three kilometers away.  The nearest railway station is located in Malchow.

References

External links

Gutshaus Bütow

Municipalities in Mecklenburg-Western Pomerania